Paramaevia michelsoni is a species of jumping spider in the family Salticidae. It is found in the United States.

References

Further reading

External links

Salticidae
Spiders described in 1955